Black Is Back! is an album by hip hop producer 9th Wonder.   It is an unofficial remix of Jay-Z's 2003 The Black Album.

Track listing
 "Interlude"
 "December 4th"
 "What More Can I Say"
 "Encore"
 "Dirt Off Your Shoulder"
 "Threat"
 "Moment Of Clarity"
 "99 Problems"
 "Interlude"
 "Justify My Thug"
 "Lucifer"
 "Allure"
 "My 1st Song"
 "Threat (different remix)"

References

9th Wonder albums
2003 remix albums
Jay-Z remix albums
Unofficial remix albums